Paul William Miller Jr. (November 8, 1930 – January 24, 2007) was an American football defensive end in the National Football League (NFL) and the American Football League (AFL). He played for the NFL's Los Angeles Rams (1954–1957) and the AFL's Dallas Texans (1960–1961) and San Diego Chargers (1962). He played college football at Louisiana State University.

1930 births
2007 deaths
Players of American football from New Orleans
American football defensive ends
LSU Tigers football players
Los Angeles Rams players
Dallas Texans (AFL) players
San Diego Chargers players
Western Conference Pro Bowl players
People from Mandeville, Louisiana
American Football League players